The Danger Girl is a 1926 American silent drama film directed by Edward Dillon and starring Priscilla Dean, John Bowers, and Gustav von Seyffertitz.

Plot
As described in a film magazine review, Wilson and Mortimer Travers, brothers, live in a New York City mansion, the former brother being a jewel collector. The police are investigating a tip that the jewels will be stolen. Marie Duquesne, dressed as a bride, drops in unexpectedly, claiming to have fled from a distasteful marriage. Wilson allows her to remain. There follows a weird series of complications, with the jewels and Marie the chief center of attraction. In the end Marie saves the jewels from the master thief. Wilson's gratitude turns to love for her.

Cast

References

Bibliography
 Munden, Kenneth White. The American Film Institute Catalog of Motion Pictures Produced in the United States, Part 1. University of California Press, 1997.

External links

1926 films
1926 drama films
Silent American drama films
Films directed by Edward Dillon
American silent feature films
1920s English-language films
Producers Distributing Corporation films
1920s American films